The college football recruiting class of 2018 refers to the recruiting of high school athletes to play college football starting in the fall of 2018. The scope of this article covers: (a) the colleges and universities with recruiting classes ranking among the top 20 in the country as assessed by at least one of the major media companies, and (b) the individual recruits ranking among the top 20 in the country as assessed by at least one of the major media companies.
Georgia was rated by 247Sports, Rivals and On3 as having the No. 1 recruiting class in 2018.  Ohio State was rated by the same selectors at No. 2.

Quarterback Trevor Lawrence was rated by Rivals, 247Sports, and USA Today as the No. 1 recruit in the 2016 class. Lawrence played for Clemson from 2018 to 2020 and for the Jacksonville Jaguars since 2021. 

Quarterback Justin Fields was rated by the same selectors as the No. 2 recruit. Fields played for Georgia in 2018, Ohio State  in 2019 and 2020, and the Chicago Bears since 2021.

Top ranked classes

Top ranked recruits

References

Recruiting class